AktionsGemeinschaft (AG) is an Austrian students' organization. In the last national-wide election in 2015, it defended its position as the strongest political faction in the Federal Parliament of the Austrian Students' Association, winning 16 out of 55 mandates. Overall, it considers itself to be non-partisan, but is politically close to the Austrian People's Party, which temporarily funded parts of its activities in the past.

AktionGemeinschaft is currently chaired by Andreas Jilly, who was elected as its chairman in August 2015.
The organization was founded in the early 1980s by a merger of the Austrian Students' Union (ideologically close to the Austrian People's Party) and the non-partisan service-oriented Austrian Students' Forum. Many of its members have also been active in various Christian and conservative students' organisations.

AktionsGemeinschaft is a member organisation of the European Democrat Students. Founded in Vienna by Scandinavian, German and Austrian students in 1961, the Freie Österreichische Studentenschaft, a legal predecessor of AG, was one of its initial members. At European level, AktionsGemeinschaft is today represented by its International Secretary, Sophia Skoda.

Famous former members 

Gerald Bast, Andreas Maislinger, Wilhelm Molterer, Gerfried Sperl, Ernst Strasser, Matthias Strolz, Markus Wallner, Harald Mahrer.

References

External links 
AktionsGemeinschaft

Student political organizations
Student organisations in Austria
Politics of Austria